Paul Collins (born 25 July 1937) is a British actor. He is best known for his role as John Darling in the 1953  Walt Disney Pictures animated film Peter Pan.

Filmography

Film

Challenge to Lassie (1949) - Tenement Child (uncredited)
Rogues of Sherwood Forest (1950) - Arthur (uncredited)
Lorna Doone (1951) - Charleworth as a Child (uncredited)
Peter Pan (1953) - John Darling (voice)
Midnight Lace (1960) - Kevin (uncredited)
Without A Trace (1983) - Reporter
Funny About Love (1990) - Bill Hatcher
Guilty by Suspicion (1991) - Bernard
The Marrying Man (1991) - Butler
Defenseless (1991) - Campaign Worker
For Richer, For Poorer (1992, TV Movie) - Stuart
Dave (1993) - Secretary of Treasury
Executive Decision (1996) - Nelson
Mother (1996) - Lawyer
Dead Man on Campus (1998) - Professor Durkheim
Instinct (1999) - Tom Hanley
The Breed (2001) - Calmet
XXX: State of the Union (2005) - NSA Director Bill Brody
Art School Confidential (2006) - Professor Divid Zipkin
Evan Almighty (2007) - Congressman Stamp
Montana Amazon (2012) - Bill

Television
Hawaii Five-O (1969) - Charlie 
Matlock (1989) - Jim Melbourne
Star Trek: Deep Space 9 (1993) - Zlangco
Beverly Hills, 90210 (1993-1995) - John Bardwell
JAG (1995-2002) - SecNav Alexander Nelson / Secretary of War John C. Spencer / Mort Reese
Profiler (1997-1998) - US Attorney
West Wing (2005) - US Senator Sam Wilkinson
Guiding Light (2007) - Tyler Meade

Video games
Metal Gear Solid 3: Snake Eater (2004) - CIA Director (English version, voice)
Metal Gear Solid 3: Subsistence (2005) - CIA Director (English version, voice)

External links

Interview with Paul Collins at Cinema Retro Published on March 8, 2013

1937 births
Living people
20th-century English male actors
21st-century English male actors
English male child actors
English male film actors
English male television actors
English male voice actors
Male actors from London